The Ukrainian Super Cup is an association football game of the Ukrainian Premier League in traditional super cup format that acts as the grand-opening for every new football competition season in Ukraine. Originally it was set as a contest between the winners of the previous season's Ukrainian Championship and Ukrainian Cup. From 2008 through 2014, it was branded as the Inter Super Cup of Ukraine, in 2017 – Super Cup Fokstrot.

History and overview
The competition and its trophy was presented on 1 July 2007 in hotel "Ekspres". In the event participated president of the Professional Football League of Ukraine (PFL) Ravil Safiullin, general director of Info-sport Marketing Serhiy Kharchenko, representative of the game general sponsor "Olimp". At the press conference Mr.Safiullin informed several details about the new tournament among which was the money prize fund that consisted of 75,000 "conditional units", a lottery for fans winner of which would receive a car, the game opening show was planned to be hosted by Ukrainian singer Kateryna Buzhynska (uk). It was also informed that there will be no extra time and series of penalty kicks would follow right after the regular time.

The president of PFL refused to disclose the amount of money that was paid to create the Super Cup trophy. He noted that the trophy will be given away for eternal keeping to the team that would win it five times.

The drawing for the trophy was created by Mykhailo Cheburakhin ("Dialan-M" company), for which he received a reward of 1,000 "conditional units".

The prize money fund for the second edition in 2005 was established at ₴375,000.

Format
The Ukrainian Super Cup usually features one representative of the Ukrainian Premier League and another the Ukrainian Cup. In event when both tournaments were won by one club, participation in the game is granted to the cup finalist (until 2014) or the league runner-up (since 2015).

On some occasions when the national cup was won by a national champion, it was challenged by the league runner-up or the cup finalist.

Venues

Traditionally playing in Odesa at the Chornomorets Stadium, the season's opening match did not initially have a "fixed" venue. The decision on conducting the match in Odesa in 2005 was adopted by the PFL Bureau three days before the game and on petition of both Dynamo and Shakhtar. Due to the preparation for UEFA Euro 2012, however, the newly established tradition changed and for the 2008 rendition it has been moved to Poltava's Oleksiy Butovsky Vorskla Stadium. In 2009, the cup venue changed once again to the Sumy's Yuvileiny Stadium which stood relatively underutilized since the main city football club went bankrupt. The 2009 edition featured Vorskla, which became the first team outside of the Ukrainian derby (Dynamo and Shakhtar) to participate. In 2007 and 2008, the Cup played-off between the first and second placed teams as one of the team won both the Cup and the Premier League.

Sponsors
The 2008 rendition was officially known as Inter Super Cup of Ukraine and sponsored by the TV channel Inter. In 2009, the contract was extended for another three years and later again to 2014. The very first Super Cup was handed over by Prime Minister of Ukraine Viktor Yanukovych.

In 2016, the tournament received another sponsor, an American construction company UDP (Urban Development + Partners).

The prize money fund in 2014 and 2015 consisted of ₴1 million. The winner was to receive 650,000 and the other finalist 350,000.

History

2004 Ukrainian Super Cup

2005 Ukrainian Super Cup

2006 Ukrainian Super Cup

2007 Ukrainian Super Cup

2008 Ukrainian Super Cup

2009 Ukrainian Super Cup

2010 Ukrainian Super Cup

2011 Ukrainian Super Cup

2012 Ukrainian Super Cup

2013 Ukrainian Super Cup

2014 Ukrainian Super Cup

2015 Ukrainian Super Cup

2016 Ukrainian Super Cup

2017 Ukrainian Super Cup

2018 Ukrainian Super Cup

2019 Ukrainian Super Cup

2020 Ukrainian Super Cup

2021 Ukrainian Super Cup

Note:

 All fixtures are played till the end of regulation time. If the score is tied, no extra time is played with penalty kicks immediately taken to determine the victory.

Performance

Performance by club

Performance by qualification

Venues

Winning managers

In bold are managers that still active in the current season. In parenthesis are cups for the respective team.

The first winning coach is Oleksiy Mykhailychenko, the first winning coach who previously won the cup as a player is Serhii Rebrov.

Winning players
In bold are players that are still active in the current season

All-time top scorers

There were 35 scorers with 49 goals.

All-time appearances

Alternate Super Cup of Ukraine
On 24 June 2004 the Professional Football League of Ukraine adopted decision to consider the next game between National champion and Cup holder in the next championship as a Super Cup match for previous seasons 1992 – 2003.
 15/11/1992 Tavriya Simferopol – Chornomorets Odesa 0:1
 08/08/1993 Dynamo Kyiv – Karpaty Lviv 2:1
 23/10/1994 Chornomorets Odesa – Dynamo Kyiv 1:1
 02/04/1995 Dynamo Kyiv – Chornomorets Odesa 1:2
 02/10/1995 Shakhtar Donetsk – Dynamo Kyiv 2:3
 21/10/1996 Nyva Vinnytsia – Dynamo Kyiv 0:1
 01/09/1997 Dynamo Kyiv – Shakhtar Donetsk 3:0
 30/10/1998 Dynamo Kyiv – CSKA Kyiv 2:0
 24/07/1999 Dynamo Kyiv – Karpaty Lviv 3:0
 16/11/2000 Kryvbas Kryvyi Rih – Dynamo Kyiv 0:2
 15/07/2001 Dynamo Kyiv – Shakhtar Donetsk 2:2
 03/06/2002 Shakhtar Donetsk – Dynamo Kyiv 2:0
 26/07/2002 Shakhtar Donetsk – Dynamo Kyiv 1:0
 05/10/2003 Dynamo Kyiv – Shakhtar Donetsk 1:1
 10/04/2004 Shakhtar Donetsk – Dynamo Kyiv 2:4

Performance by club

See also
 Soviet Super Cup
 Ukrainian Premier League

References

External links

 Ukraine saw the Super Cup (Украина увидела Суперкубок). UA-Football. 1 July 2004.
 Banyas, V. About the Season's Cup in Ukraine (Про Кубок сезону в Україні). Ukrainian Premier League. 14 July 2017

 
Super Cup
Ukraine
Recurring sporting events established in 2004
2004 establishments in Ukraine
Ukrainian Premier League